Blue Light Boogie may refer to:

 "Blue Light Boogie" (song), a 1950 song by Louis Jordan
 Blue Light Boogie (album), a 1999 album by Taj Mahal